I Want the Floor is a 1975 Soviet drama film directed by Gleb Panfilov.

Plot 
The film tells about a strong woman, Yelizaveta Uvarova, who becomes the chairman of the city executive committee of Zlatograd.

Cast 
 Inna Churikova as Yelizaveta Andreyevna Uvarova
 Nikolai Gubenko as Sergei Uvarov
 Ekaterina Volkova as Lena
 Leonid Bronevoy as Pyotr Vasilyevich Altukhov
 Vasily Shukshin as Fyodor (voiced by Igor Yefimov)
 Valentina Kovel as Tanechka
 Dmitry Bessonov as Spartak Ivanovich
 Vadim Medvedev as Vladimir Vikentyevich
 Nikolai Sergeyev as Stepan Trofimovich Bushuyev
 Ernst Romanov as Kozlov

References

External links 
 

1975 films
1970s Russian-language films
Soviet drama films
1975 drama films